Charles-Émile Reynaud (8 December 1844 – 9 January 1918) was a French inventor, responsible for the praxinoscope (an animation device patented in 1877 that improved on the zoetrope) and was responsible for the first projected animated films. His Pantomimes Lumineuses
premiered on 28 October 1892 in Paris. His Théâtre Optique film system, patented in 1888, is also notable as the first known instance of film perforations being used. The performances predated Auguste and Louis Lumière's first paid public screening of the cinematographe on 26 December 1895, often seen as the birth of cinema.

Biography
Charles-Émile Reynaud was born on 8 December 1844 in Montreuil-sous-Bois (now a suburb of Paris). His father Benoît-Claude-Brutus Reynaud was an engineer and medal engraver originally from Le Puy-en-Velay and his mother Marie-Caroline Bellanger had been a school teacher, but 
stayed at home to raise and educate Émile from his birth. Marie-Caroline was trained in watercolor painting by Pierre-Joseph Redouté
and taught her son drawing and painting techniques. Brutus gave him little tasks in his workshop and by the age of 13 Émile was able to build small steam engines. In 1858 he became an apprentice at a Paris company where he repaired, assembled and developed optical and physics instruments. He then learned industrial design at another company, before working as an operator for photographer Antoine Samuel Adam-Salomon. By 1862 he started his own career as a photographer in Paris. He became an assistant to the famous Abbé Moigno in 1864. Moigno gave lecture-screenings with the magic lantern and converted Émile to Catholicism, since his parents had raised him without religion. When his father died in December 1865 Émile moved with his mother to Puy-en-Velay where Brutus' cousin Dr. Claude Auguste Reynaud further educated Émile in Greek, Latin, physics, chemistry, mechanics and natural science.
In December 1873 Émile Reynaud started giving weekly scientific screening-lectures for the students of the industrial schools of Puy-en-Velay, free of charge and open to the general public. He used personally made photographic magic lantern slides in two projectors, sometimes dissolving from one projection to another.

After Reynaud read a series of articles on optical toys published in La Nature in 1876, he created a prototype praxinoscope out of a discarded cookie box. He applied for a French patent on 30 August 1877 for his then unnamed device (settling on the name Praxinoscope before the English patent of 13 November 1877) and returned to Paris in December 1877 to manufacture and market his invention.

On 21 October 1879 Émile Reynaud married Marguerite Rémiatte in Paris. They had two sons: Paul (1880) and André (1882).

Similarly to Georges Méliès, Reynaud's late years were tragic after 1910 when, his creations outmoded by the cinematograph, dejected and penniless, he threw the greater part of his irreplaceable work and unique equipment into the Seine. The public had forgotten his "Théâtre Optique" shows, which had been a celebrated attraction at the Musée Grevin between 1892 and 1900. He died in a hospice on the banks of the Seine where he had been cared for since 29 March 1917.

Filmography
The 5 Pantomimes Lumineuses were painted directly onto a transparent strip of images of shellac protected gelatin and manipulated by hand to create an approximately 15 minute show comprising approximately 500 images per title. The three Photo-peintures animées (animated photo-paintings) were directed with the Photo-Scénographe, a camera inspired by the Chronophotographe à bande mobile of Étienne-Jules Marey.

Praxinoscope strips (1877–1879)

Series 1
 L'Aquarium
 Le Jongleur
 L'Équilibriste
 Le Repas des Poulets
 Les Bulles de Savon
 Le Rotisseur
 La Danse sur la Corde
 Les Chiens Savants
 Le Jeu de Corde
 Zim, Boum, Boum

Series 2
 Les Scieurs de Long
 Le Jeu du Volant
 Le Moulin à Eau
 Le Déjeuner de Bébé
 La Rosace Magique
 Les Papillons
 Le Trapèze
 La Nageuse
 Le Singe Musicien 
 La Glissade

Series 3
 La Charmeuse
 La Balançoire
 L'Hercule
 Les Deux Espiègles
 Le Fumeur
 Le Jeu de grâces
 L'Amazone
 Le Steeple-chase
 Les Petits valseurs
 Les Clowns

Inventions 

 The praxinoscope, 1876
 The praxinoscope-jouet (toy praxinoscope), 1877
 The praxinoscope-théâtre, 1879
 The projecting praxinoscope, 1880
 Image bands with central perforation.
 The Théâtre Optique, 1888
 The stéréo-cinéma (animations in 3D), 1907

Books and references
Dominique Auzel, Émile Reynaud et l'image s'anima biographie d'Émile Reynaud
éditions du May (1992),  (photos en couleurs)
And at Dreamland éditeur (2000),  (photos en noir et blanc)

References

External links

 
 Kinodinamico
 Who's Who of Victorian Cinema Biography
 Biography
 Biography
 Interactive display about Reynaud from the Cinémathèque française

1844 births
1918 deaths
Cinema pioneers
19th-century French inventors
French animators
French animated film directors
People from Montreuil, Seine-Saint-Denis
Articles containing video clips